David Kent Purcey (born April 22, 1982) is an American former professional baseball pitcher. He played in Major League Baseball (MLB) for the Toronto Blue Jays, Oakland Athletics, Detroit Tigers and Chicago White Sox.

Amateur career
Purcey attended high school at Trinity Christian Academy in Addison, Texas, and then attended the University of Oklahoma, where he played for the Sooners baseball team. In 2003, he played collegiate summer baseball with the Orleans Cardinals of the Cape Cod Baseball League and was named a league all-star.

Professional career

Draft
Purcey originally was drafted in the 2001 MLB draft by the Seattle Mariners in the 20th round. He then was drafted again by the New York Yankees in the 17th round of the 2003 MLB draft, and finally drafted once again by Toronto in the first round (16th overall) during the 2004 MLB draft.

Toronto Blue Jays
Purcey made his major league debut on April 18, 2008, starting against the Detroit Tigers and allowing one earned run over  innings. He was returned to the minor leagues after two major league appearances, but was recalled to the Blue Jays in July, and ended the 2008 season in the team's starting rotation. On August 27, 2008, Purcey started against the Tampa Bay Rays and pitched his first career major league complete game. He recorded 11 strikeouts and scattered five hits through eight innings of work.

Following spring training 2009, Purcey earned the third spot in the rotation, but switched spots with Jesse Litsch to separate the left-handers. Purcey was second in the rotation until May 1, 2009 when he was assigned to the Toronto Blue Jays AAA affiliate Las Vegas 51s. Purcey went on to split the remainder of the season between the Blue Jays and Las Vegas. He posted a record of 1–3 and a 6.19 ERA in nine starts with Toronto in 2009. He often struggled with his command, which improved somewhat with Las Vegas.

On May 24, 2010, Purcey was recalled by Toronto and moved to the bullpen as a relief pitcher after Dana Eveland was designated for assignment.  On July 26, 2010, Purcey recorded his first major league save against the Baltimore Orioles in a 9–5 win.

Oakland Athletics
Purcey was traded by the Blue Jays on April 18, 2011, to the Oakland Athletics in exchange for minor league relief pitcher Danny Farquhar. Purcey was acquired after injuries to Rich Harden and Dallas Braden.

Detroit Tigers
On May 27, 2011, Purcey was traded to the Detroit Tigers for Scott Sizemore. Purcey was designated for assignment on August 2, 2011.

Philadelphia Phillies
Purcey signed a minor league contract with the Philadelphia Phillies on December 9, 2011. He also received an invitation to spring training. Purcey spent the year with Triple-A Lehigh Valley, going 1–4 with a 4.37 ERA in 47 games (one start) while striking out 63 in 57.2 innings pitched.

Chicago White Sox
On November 21, 2012, Purcey signed a minor league deal with the Chicago White Sox. He started the 2013 season with the Triple-A Charlotte Knights. On July 3, 2013, his contract was purchased by the White Sox to replace Jesse Crain who was placed on the disabled list. While with the White Sox, Purcey suffered a strained ulnar collateral ligament in his left elbow during the last week of the 2013 season. He was outrighted to Charlotte on October 18, 2013.

The White Sox signed Purcey to a minor league contract with spring training invitation on November 8, 2013. On May 12, 2014, Purcey was released by the White Sox.

Uni-President 7-Eleven Lions
Purcey signed with the Uni-President 7-Eleven Lions in March 2015.

References

External links

1982 births
Living people
Baseball players from Chicago
American expatriate baseball players in Canada
American expatriate baseball players in Taiwan
Major League Baseball pitchers
University of Oklahoma alumni
Toronto Blue Jays players
Oakland Athletics players
Detroit Tigers players
Chicago White Sox players
Oklahoma Sooners baseball players
Orleans Firebirds players
Auburn Doubledays players
Dunedin Blue Jays players
New Hampshire Fisher Cats players
Syracuse SkyChiefs players
Syracuse Chiefs players
Las Vegas 51s players
Toledo Mud Hens players
Lehigh Valley IronPigs players
Charlotte Knights players
Somerset Patriots players
Uni-President 7-Eleven Lions players
Anchorage Glacier Pilots players